Bryce Hunt (born July 7, 1982) is an American former competition swimmer who represented the United States at the 2004 Summer Olympics in Athens, Greece.  Hunt competed in the men's 200-meter backstroke and advanced to the event semifinals, where he recorded a time of 1:59.74—the tenth-best time of the 2004 Olympics.

Hunt attended Auburn University, where he swam for the Auburn Tigers swimming and diving team in National Collegiate Athletic Association (NCAA) competition.  He was also a member of the U.S. national team for the 2001 World University Games and the 2003 World Championships.

Bryce currently works as a resident physician at the University of Alabama Tuscaloosa Family Medicine Residency Program located in Tuscaloosa, Alabama.

In 2016, Hunt parodied his Olympic past as part of a sketch for UA family medicine yearly lampoons video. In his scene from the skit "They Came from the North" (in which  the premise reveals Canadians are really aliens;) Hunt attempted to lure the aliens away from the main character, inevitably failing when trying to swim in a grassy field. He is last seen utterly the line "I'm not as good on land!"

See also
 List of Auburn University people

References

External links
 
 
 

1982 births
Living people
American male backstroke swimmers
Auburn Tigers men's swimmers
Olympic swimmers of the United States
People from Newburgh, Indiana
Swimmers at the 2004 Summer Olympics
Universiade medalists in swimming
Universiade gold medalists for the United States
Medalists at the 2001 Summer Universiade